Kitase is a town in the Akuapim South Municipal District of the Eastern Region of south Ghana. It shares borders with Peduase which is one of the entry points  from Accra to Akuapem.

Festival 
The People of Kitase celebrate Odwira and this ceremony is usually held in September/October. Odwira is one of Ghana's many festivals that see attendance from people from all walks of life including the diaspora.

For many decades, the Odwira Festival has been a staple of Ghana's colourful, vibrant and diverse cultural expression, bringing together people from all walks of life to celebrate themes of victory, gratitude and harvest, in unity. However, even before Odwira became a part of Ghana's cultural landscape it had long been celebrated by the people of Akropong, Amanokrom and Aburi in the Eastern Region.

References 

Populated places in the Eastern Region (Ghana)
Villages in Ghana